Jesús Vargas may refer to:
 Jessie Vargas, American boxer
 Jesús Vargas (footballer), Venezuelan footballer
 Jesus Vargas (general), Philippine Army general and politician